Ronald Allen Williams (born 1949) is an American Businessman, Entrepreneur and management consultant, and board director on corporate, public sector and non-profit boards. Williams is the author of Learning to Lead: The Journey to Leading Yourself, Leading Others, and Leading an Organization, which appeared on The Wall Street Journal's best seller list.  He is founder, chairman and CEO of RW2 Enterprises, LLC. He is the former chairman, president and chief executive officer (CEO) of Aetna Inc., a diversified benefits company. Aetna is now part of CVS Health.

Following his retirement from Aetna, Williams formed RW2 Enterprises, LLC. He coaches and consults with senior corporate executives of Fortune 100 companies on transformational leadership strategy, board preparedness and business strategy. He works on issues such as value creation in health care in the US, such as a value-based approach to health care, where physicians, health care providers, insurers, employers and consumers are working together to achieve more affordable, better quality health care.

Business leadership 
Williams serves on the board of directors of American Express, Boeing and Johnson and Johnson. He is also an operating advisor to the private equity firm Clayton, Dubilier & Rice (CD&R), where he has successfully guided three CD&R portfolio company exits: naviHealth, PharMEDium and Envision Healthcare. He is chairman of the board of agilon health, a company partnering with physicians to create next generation value-based care delivery. agilon health was launched in 2016.

Williams is chairman of The Conference Board. Williams led and co-sponsored TCB's efforts to create the millennial leader report "Divergent Views/Common Ground, the leadership perspective of C-Suite Executives and Millennial Leaders." This report encourages C-Suite executives to better navigate millennial leader talent development and coaching. Williams  participates with the Committee for Economic Development (CED), and co-chaired two of CED's studies: Adjusting the Prescription and Modernizing Medicare.

In January 2010, he co-chaired the World Economic Forum's annual meeting in Davos, Switzerland. He also previously served as vice chairman of The Business Council from 2008 to 2010, vice chairman of the Health Leadership Council, and chairman of the Council for Affordable Quality Healthcare (CAQH). He also was an advisor to The Wall Street Journal CEO Council and a former member of the GE Healthymagination Advisory Committee. In 2023, he began as a member of the McKinsey & Company External Advisory Group.

Aetna leadership 
Williams served as both chairman and CEO of Aetna until November 2010 and as chairman through April 2011.  He also served as chairman of the Aetna Foundation from 2006 to April 2011. During his tenure, Aetna was named Fortune magazine's most admired Company in the Health Care: Insurance and Managed Care category for three consecutive years. Aetna 2011 revenues were $34 billion and the firm ranked 77th on the Fortune 100 list (the year he stepped down as chairman).

Joining Aetna in 2001, Williams focused on company's strategy, culture, operating performance and financial results. In 2002, Williams was named president and joined Aetna's board. He was named CEO in February 2006 and chairman of the board in October 2006. In 2001, Aetna reported a net loss from continuing operations of $292 million and earnings per share loss from continuing operations of $0.46. In 2011, full-year operating earnings were $2.0 billion with operating earnings per share of $5.17 producing a 12.3 percent operating EPS CAGR over the last five years.

Under his leadership, Aetna worked to catalyze change, focusing the industry, public policy leaders, physicians and employers on issues aimed at increasing access and affordability, and transforming American health care into a more efficient system that delivers greater value to all Americans. He has advocated for specific reforms in broadcast media interviews and has authored or co-authored op-ed articles in The Wall Street Journal, The Washington Post, the Financial Times and the Seattle Post-Intelligencer.

Public service 
Williams chairs the Health Systems Initiative at MIT Sloan, which conducts research and convenes leaders to drive action on the most pressing issues in healthcare. He also serves on MIT's North America Executive Board.

Williams is a board member of NAF, a national network of education, business, and community leaders who work together to ensure high school students are college, career, and future ready. NAF partners with high-need communities to build NAF academies focused on growing industries such as health care, IT, finance, hospitality and tourism.

In March 2011, Williams was appointed to the President's Management Advisory Board, which was assembled by U.S. President Barack Obama. He served in that capacity until 2017. He serves on the board of the National Academy Foundation (NAF), the Peterson Center on Healthcare board of advisors, the Peterson Institute for International Economics and the RAND Health board of advisors.

In 2013 he was elected to the American Academy of Arts and Sciences, an independent, multidisciplinary policy research center, and became a trustee of the Committee for Economic Development, a non-profit, non-partisan, business-led public policy organization.

Early business career 
Prior to joining Aetna, Williams served as group president, and president of WellPoint (now Anthem), having joined WellPoint's predecessor firm, Blue Cross of California, in 1987. Previously, he was co-founder of Visa Health Corp. and group marketing executive of Control Data Corporation.

Education 
Williams holds a Bachelor of Arts in psychology from Roosevelt University and a Master of Business Administration from the MIT Sloan School of Management.

External activities, awards and recognition 
Williams continues to appear in the news media. During his career, Williams has received media recognition and other awards including:

 Modern Healthcare magazine's  "100 Most Powerful People in Healthcare 2009"
 Black Enterprise magazine's "100 Most Powerful Executives in Corporate America, 2009"
 Institutional Investor magazine's 2009 "America's Best CEOs Health Care Managed Care category"

References

External links 

 
 Aetna Inc.
 WSJ CEO Council 2011 Special Report (pdf)
 How the Experts Would Fix Health Care, Bloomberg BusinessWeek, February 23, 2012
 Fix This: Health Care, Bloomberg BusinessWeek Conversation (videos), February 23, 2012

1949 births
20th-century American businesspeople
21st-century American businesspeople
Aetna employees
American chairpersons of corporations
American chief executives of Fortune 500 companies
American company founders
American Express people
American health care chief executives
Boeing people
Businesspeople from Chicago
Businesspeople from Hartford, Connecticut
Date of birth missing (living people)
Johnson & Johnson people
Living people
MIT Sloan School of Management alumni
Roosevelt University alumni
Peterson Institute for International Economics